Inés Suárez, (c. 1507 – 1580) was a Spanish conquistadora who participated in the Conquest of Chile with Pedro de Valdivia, successfully defending the newly conquered Santiago against an attack in 1541 by the indigenous Mapuche.

Early life
Suárez was born in Plasencia, Extremadura, Spain in 1507. She came to the Americas approximately in 1537, around the age of thirty. It is generally assumed that she was in search of her husband Juan de Málaga, who had left Spain to serve in the New World with the Pizarro brothers. After a long time of continuous searching in numerous South American locations, she arrived in Lima in 1538.

Suárez's husband had died before she had reached Peru (she told a compatriot that he died at sea) and the next information that is known of her is in 1539, when she applied for and was granted, as the widow of a Spanish soldier, a small plot of land in Cuzco and encomienda rights to a number of Indians.

Shortly afterward, Suárez became the mistress of Pedro de Valdivia, the conqueror of Chile. The earliest mention of her friendship with Valdivia was after he returned from the Battle of Las Salinas (1538). Although they were from the same area of Spain and at least one novelist relates a tale of long-standing love between them, there is no real evidence that they had met prior to her arrival in Cuzco.

Conquest of Chile

In late 1539, over the objections of Francisco Martínez and encouraged by some of his captains, Valdivia, using the intermediary services of a Mercedarian priest, requested official permission for Suárez to become a part of the group of 12 Spaniards he was leading to the South. Francisco Pizarro, in his letter to Valdivia (January 1540) granting permission for Suárez to accompany Valdivia as his domestic servant, addressed the following words to Suárez, "...as Valdivia tells me, the men are afraid to go on such a long trip and you very courageously put yourself in the face of that danger..."

During the long and harrowing trip to the south, Suárez, in addition to caring for Valdivia and treating the sick and wounded, found water for them in the desert, and saved Valdivia when one of his rivals tried to undermine his enterprise and take his life. The natives, having already experienced the incursions of the Spaniards, (Diego de Almagro, 1535–1536) burned their crops and drove off their livestock, leaving nothing for Valdivia's band and the animals which accompanied them.

In December 1540, eleven months after they left Cuzco, Valdivia and his band reached the valley of the Mapocho river, where Valdivia was to establish the capital of the territory. The valley was extensive and well populated with natives. Its soil was fertile and there was abundant fresh water. Two high hills provided defensive positions. Soon after their arrival, Valdivia tried to convince the natives of his good intentions, sending  delegations bearing gifts for the caciques.

The natives kept the gifts but, united under the leadership of Michimalonco, attacked the Spaniards and were at the point of overwhelming them. Suddenly, the natives threw down their weapons and fled. Captured Indians declared that they had seen a man, mounted on a white horse and carrying a naked sword, descend from the clouds and attack them. The Spaniards decided it was a miraculous appearance of Santo Iago (Saint James the Greater who had already been seen during the Reconquista at the  battle of Clavijo) and, in thanks, named the new city Santiago del Nuevo Extremo. The city was officially dedicated on February 12, 1541.

First destruction of Santiago

In August 1541, when Valdivia was occupied on the coast, Suárez uncovered another plot to unseat him. After the plotters were taken care of, Valdivia turned his attention to the Indians and he invited seven caciques to meet with him to arrange for the delivery of food. When the Indians arrived, Valdivia had them held as hostages for the safe delivery of the provisions and the safety of outlying settlements. On the September 9, Valdivia took forty men and left the city to put down an uprising of Indians near Aconcagua.

Early on the morning of September 10, 1541, a young yanakuna brought word to Captain Alonso de Monroy, who had been left in charge of the city, that the woods around the city were full of natives. Suárez was asked if she thought that the Indian hostages should be released as a peace gesture. She replied that she saw it as a bad idea; if the Indians overpowered the Spaniards, the hostages would provide their only bargaining power. Monroy accepted her counsel and issued a call for a council of war.

Just before dawn on September 11, mounted Spaniards rode out to engage the Indians, whose numbers were estimated first at 8,000 and later at 20,000, and who were led by Michimalonco. In spite of the advantage of their horses and their skill with their swords, by noon the Spaniards were pushed into a retreat toward the east, across the Mapocho River; and, by mid-afternoon, they were backed up to the plaza itself.

All day the battle raged. Fire arrows and torches set fire to most of the city; four Spaniards were killed along with a score of horses and other animals. The situation became desperate. The priest, Rodrigo González Marmolejo, said later that the fight was like the Day of Judgment for the Spaniards and that only a miracle saved them.

All day Suárez had been carrying food and water to the fighting men, nursing the wounded, giving them encouragement and comfort. The historian Mariño de Lobera wrote of her activities during the battle: 

Suárez recognized the discouragement of the men and the extreme danger of the situation; she offered a suggestion. All day the seven caciques who were prisoners of the Spaniards, had been shouting encouragement to their people. Suárez proposed that Spaniards decapitate the seven and toss their heads out among the Indians in order to frighten them. There was some objection to the plan, since several men felt that the fall of the city was imminent and that the captive caciques would be their only bargaining advantage with the Indians. Suárez insisted that hers was the only viable solution to their problem. She then went to the house where the chieftains were guarded by Francisco Rubio and Hernando de la Torre and gave the order for the execution. Mariño de Lobera tells that the guard, La Torre, asked, "In what manner shall we kill them, my lady?" "In this manner," she replied, and, seizing la Torre's sword, she herself cut off the heads.       
After the seven were decapitated and their heads thrown out among the Indians, Suárez donned a coat of mail and a helmet and, throwing a hide cloak over her shoulders, she rode out on her white horse. According to an eyewitness, "...she went out to the plaza and put herself in front of all the soldiers, encouraging them with words of such exaggerated praise that they treated her as if she were a brave captain,...instead of a woman masquerading as a soldier in iron mail."

The Spaniards took advantage of the confusion and disorder engendered among the Indians by the gory heads, and spurred on Suárez, succeeded in driving the now disordered Indians from the town. One historian wrote, "The Indians said afterward that the Christians would have been defeated were it not for a woman on a white horse."

In 1545, in recognition of her courage and valor, Valdivia rewarded Suárez with an encomienda. His testament of dedication said in part:

Later life

Suárez continued to live openly with Pedro de Valdivia, until the time of his trial in Lima. One of the charges levelled against him was that he, being married, openly lived with her "...in the manner of man and wife". In exchange for being freed, and his confirmation as Royal Governor, he was forced to relinquish her and to bring to Chile his wife, Marina Ortiz de Gaete, who only arrived after Valdivia's death in 1554. He was also ordered to marry Suárez off.

Suárez was married in 1549 to Valdivia's captain, Rodrigo de Quiroga, when she was 42 and the groom was 38. After her marriage, she led a very quiet life, dedicated to her home and to charity. She was held in great esteem in Chile, as being a valiant woman and a great captain. Eventually, after the death of Valdivia, her husband twice became Royal Governor himself, in 1565 and 1575. They both died in Santiago de Chile, within months of each other, in 1580.

Suárez's legacy
Suárez is seen as a symbol of a Chilean woman standing up to authority like Paula Jaraquemada and Javiera Carrera. She is still mentioned as a role model to contemporary protestors against mistreatment.

Suárez is the main character in several historical novels, such as "Inés y las raíces de la tierra", ("Inés and the roots of the land"), by María Correa Morande (ZigZag, 1964),  "Ay Mamá Inés - Crónica Testimonial" ("Woe, Momma Inés - Testimonial Chronicle") (Andres Bello, 1993) by Jorge Guzmán, and "Inés of My Soul" by Isabel Allende (HarperCollins, 2006). In her author's note Allende wrote: "This novel is a work of intuition, but any similarity to events and persons relating to the conquest of Chile is not coincidental".
Allende's novel has been adapted as a Spanish-Chilean television series in 2020.
Elena Rivera (27-year-old during shooting) plays Suárez.

Further reading

See also

Arauco War
Francisco de Aguirre
Jerónimo de Alderete
Catalina de Erauso
Mapuche people
Rodrigo de Quiroga
Pedro de Valdivia
Francisco de Villagra

Notes

Sources

Maura, Juan Francisco. 2005.Españolas de ultramar en la historia y en la literatura: aventureras, madres, soldados, virreinas, gobernadoras, adelantadas, prostitutas, empresarias, monjas, escritoras, criadas y esclavas en la expansión ibérica ultramarina (siglos XV a XVII) http://parnaseo.uv.es/Editorial/Maura/INDEX.HTM |=PDF online facsimile|others=Hernando Maura (illus.) |location=Valencia, Spain |publisher=Colección Parnaseo — Universitat de València

 

1500s births
1580 deaths
People from Plasencia
Extremaduran conquistadors
Women in 16th-century warfare
16th-century Spanish people
Spanish explorers
Female explorers
Women in war in South America
16th-century Chilean people
Spanish conquistadors